Driehuizen is a village in the Dutch province of North Holland. It is a part of the municipality of Alkmaar, and lies about 8 km south of the city of Alkmaar. The name literally means Three houses, and was first mentioned in 1639.

According to legend, there were three houses in 1603. After the Schermer was poldered in 1635, it received a road connection to Zuidschermer. Driehuizen was home to 156 people in 1840.

The former Dutch Reformed church is an aisleless church with wooden tower which was built in 1912 as a replacement of the 1648 church. It is nowadays used as village house.

Gallery

References

Populated places in North Holland
Alkmaar